Hyner View State Park is a  Pennsylvania state park in Chapman Township, Clinton County, Pennsylvania in the United States. Hyner View State Park is surrounded by Sproul State Forest.

The lookout area is bordered by a large stone wall that was built by the Civilian Conservation Corps during the Great Depression. The current access road from Hyner Run State park was built in 1949 (it also connects to a dirt road that leads to Pennsylvania Route 44). After the new access road opened, the first Flaming Fall Foliage Festival was held at the park. It has since outgrown the park and is currently held in nearby Renovo. The park was officially transferred to the Bureau of State Parks in 1965.

Hyner View State Park was chosen by the Pennsylvania Department of Conservation and Natural Resources (DCNR) and its Bureau of Parks as one of "25 Must-See Pennsylvania State Parks".

The park is the location of a scenic lookout and a contains a launching point for hang gliding. Visitors to Hyner View State Park can see the West Branch Susquehanna River for many miles both up and downstream. Hang gliders can be launched from a ramp just below the lookout wall and glide over the river valley. The park has a small picnic area, a parking area, and restrooms.

Fire Wardens Monument

Hyner View State Park is the site of a monument to the state's forest fire wardens, erected in 1965 by the Forest Inspectors Association. The monument consists of a large monolith with a plaque reading "1915 - 1965 Dedicated to the Forest Fire Wardens of Pennsylvania in recognition of their faithful service to the Commonwealth during the past fifty years".

The monolith is at the head of a low, keystone-shaped concrete wall. On each of the two long sides of the keystone are ten stones, one for each of the twenty state forests in Pennsylvania. Each stone is a rough cube in shape and each was taken from its respective state forest.

Nearby state parks

The following state parks are within  of Hyner View State Park:
Bald Eagle State Park (Centre County)
Bucktail State Park Natural Area (Cameron and Clinton Counties)
Cherry Springs State Park (Potter County) 
Colton Point State Park (Tioga County)
Hyner Run State Park (Clinton County)
Kettle Creek State Park (Clinton County)
Leonard Harrison State Park (Tioga County)
Little Pine State Park (Lycoming County) 
Lyman Run State Park (Potter County)
Ole Bull State Park (Potter County)
Patterson State Park (Potter County)
Prouty Place State Park (Potter County)
Ravensburg State Park (Clinton County)
Sinnemahoning State Park (Cameron and Potter Counties)
Upper Pine Bottom State Park (Lycoming County)

Gallery

See also

References

External links

  148 KB
Hyner Hang Gliding Club Website

State parks of Pennsylvania
Protected areas established in 1965
Civilian Conservation Corps in Pennsylvania
Parks in Clinton County, Pennsylvania
Protected areas of Clinton County, Pennsylvania